The following is a timeline of the history of the city of Hamadan, Iran.

Prior to 20th century

 640s - Arabs in power.
 806 - City besieged by forces of al-Amin.
 931 - City besieged by forces of Ziyarid Mardāvij.
 956 - Earthquake.
 976 - Buyid Mu'ayyad al-Dawla in power.
 997 - Shams al-Dawla in power.
 1021 - Sama' al-Dawla in power.
 1221 - City sacked by Mongols.
 1224 - City sacked by Mongols again.
 1315 -  built (approximate date).
 1724 - City sacked by forces of Ahmad Pasha of Baghdad.
 1732 - City taken by forces of Nāder Shah Afšār; Ottomans ousted.
 1789 - Agha Mohammad Khan Qajar takes Hamadan.
 1838 - Congregational mosque built.
 1883 -  (shrine) built.

20th century

 1920 - Population: 30,000-40,000 (approximate estimate).
 1932 -  built.
 1933 - City redesigned to accommodate motorcars; central Meidun-e Emam Khomeini and 6 radiating boulevards laid out.
 1940 - Population: 103,874.
 1952 - Avicenna Mausoleum erected.
 1963 - Population: 114,610 (estimate).
 1970 -  erected.
 1973 - Bu-Ali Sina University established.
 1976 - Population: 164,785 city; 229,977 urban agglomeration.
 1986 - Population: 272,499.
 1996 - Population: 401,281.

21st century

 2007 - PAS Hamedan F.C. (football club) formed.
 2009 - Shahid Mofatteh Stadium opens.
 2011 - Population: 525,794.
 2013 - 14 June: Local election held.
 2014 - Syed Mustafa Rasul becomes mayor.

See also
  (de)
 Ecbatana, ancient city at site of present-day Hamadan
 Hamadan Province history
 Timelines of other cities in Iran: Bandar Abbas, Isfahan, Kerman, Mashhad, Qom, Shiraz, Tabriz, Tehran, Yazd

References

This article incorporates information from the Persian Wikipedia and German Wikipedia.

Bibliography

in English
 
 
 
 
  (Mostly about ancient Ecbatana)

in other languages
 
  (Bibliography)

External links

 
 Items related to Hamadan, various dates (via Qatar Digital Library)
 
 
 Items related to Hamadan, various dates (via Europeana)

Images

Years in Iran
Hamadan
Hamadan
History of Hamadan Province